Agonius (Ancient Greek: Ἀγώνιος) or Enagonius was an epithet of several gods in Greek mythology (or a distinct deity). Aeschylus and Sophocles use it of Apollo and Zeus, and apparently in the sense of helpers in struggles and contests, or possibly as the protectors of soldiers. But Agonius is more especially used as an epithet of Hermes, who presides over all kinds of solemn contests, such as the Agonalia.  Classical scholar William Warde Fowler thought it likely the deity or the epithets were merely inventions of the pontifices.

According to a 19th-century catalog of Greek and Roman art in the Vatican Palace, there was in that building a statue considered by the museum's curator to be that of Hermes Enagonius, dated to the time of Lysippos, although other critics have variously believed the statue to depict Heracles, Theseus or Meleager.

"Agonius" was also the original name of the Quirinal Hill in Rome.

Notes

References 

 Aeschylus, translated in two volumes. 2. Agamemnon by Herbert Weir Smyth, Ph. D. Cambridge, MA. Harvard University Press. 1926. Online version at the Perseus Digital Library. Greek text available from the same website.
 Pausanias, Description of Greece with an English Translation by W.H.S. Jones, Litt.D., and H.A. Ormerod, M.A., in 4 Volumes. Cambridge, MA, Harvard University Press; London, William Heinemann Ltd. 1918. . Online version at the Perseus Digital Library
Pausanias, Graeciae Descriptio. 3 vols. Leipzig, Teubner. 1903.  Greek text available at the Perseus Digital Library.
 Pindar, Odes translated by Diane Arnson Svarlien. 1990. Online version at the Perseus Digital Library.
 Pindar, The Odes of Pindar including the Principal Fragments with an Introduction and an English Translation by Sir John Sandys, Litt.D., FBA. Cambridge, MA., Harvard University Press; London, William Heinemann Ltd. 1937. Greek text available at the Perseus Digital Library.
 Sophocles, The Trachiniae of Sophocles edited with introduction and notes by Sir Richard Jebb. Cambridge. Cambridge University Press. 1893. Online version at the Perseus Digital Library.
 Sophocles, Sophocles. Vol 2: Ajax. Electra. Trachiniae. Philoctetes with an English translation by F. Storr. The Loeb classical library, 21. Francis Storr. London; New York. William Heinemann Ltd.; The Macmillan Company. 1913. Greek text available at the Perseus Digital Library.

Epithets of Apollo
Epithets of Zeus
Epithets of Hermes